Offaly East (sometimes spelled Ophaly) is a barony  in County Kildare, Republic of Ireland.

Etymology
Offaly East takes its name from the Kingdom of Uí Failghe. It is not to be confused with County Offaly.

Location

Offaly East is located in western County Kildare, containing much of The Curragh and the Bog of Allen.

History
Offaly East was part of the ancient lands of the Ua Conchobhair Failghe (O'Connor Faly). As Lord of Clanmaliere the Ó Diomasaigh (O'Dempsey) held part of this barony. The Offaly barony was divided into west and east baronies before 1807.

List of settlements

Below is a list of settlements in Offaly East:
Kildare
Rathangan
Suncroft

See also

Offaly West

References

Baronies of County Kildare